= Stellenbosch Theological Journal =

- Discipline: Systematic theology
- Language: Afrikaans, Dutch, English
- Edited by: Robert Vosloo

Publication details
- Former names: Dutch Reformed Theological Journal; Die Nederduitse Gereformeerde Teologiese Tydskrif
- History: 1959–present
- Publisher: Pieter de Waal Neethling Trust at the Department of Systematic Theology and Ecclesiology (Stellenbosch University) (South Africa)
- Frequency: Biannual
- Open access: Yes
- License: Creative Commons Attribution License

Standard abbreviations
- ISO 4: Stellenbosch Theol. J.

Indexing
- ISSN: 2413-9459 (print); 2413-9467 (web)
- OCLC no.: 972074002
- Dutch Reformed Theological Journal
- ISSN: 0028-2006 (print); 2226-2385 (web)

Links
- Journal homepage; Online access; Online archives; Dutch Reformed Theological Journal online archive

The Stellenbosch Theological Journal (Afrikaans: Stellenbosch Teologiese Joernaal) is a biannual peer-reviewed academic journal covering all aspects of theology. It was established in 1959 as the Dutch Reformed Theological Journal/Die Nederduitse Gereformeerde Teologiese Tydskrif, obtaining its current title in 2015. It is published by the Department of Systematic Theology of Stellenbosch University.
